Jack Jones (born December 20, 1997) is an American football cornerback for the New England Patriots of the National Football League (NFL). He played college football at USC and Moorpark College before transferring to Arizona State and was drafted by the Patriots in the fourth round of the 2022 NFL Draft.

College career
Jones was ranked as a fivestar and the #19 overall recruit by 247Sports.com coming out of high school. He committed to USC on February 3, 2016, over offers from Alabama and Texas A&M on an interview with Snoop Dogg. He became a starter for the team during his sophomore season, but was dismissed before his junior season due to academic struggles. He transferred to Moorpark College, a junior college in California in an effort to improve his grades. After improving his grades at Moorpark College, he committed to Arizona State as a threestar JUCO recruit. During his junior year for the Sun Devils, Jones played in 13 games and started in one. In the Territorial Cup against the University of Arizona, Jones recorded 2 interceptions and was subsequently named the Pac-12 Defensive Player of the week. Jones finished the 2019 season with a Pac-12 All-Conference selection and a Pro Football Focus Pac-12 Honorable Mention. Jones only played in 2 games in the 2020 season as a senior and recorded 5 total tackles for the year. He returned to play for Arizona State as a graduate student in 2021 where he recorded 42 tackles including 2.5 tackles for a loss and a strip sack. Jones had 3 interceptions in 2021 with an 86-yard pick-six against Arizona on November 27. Jones received an Honorable Mention Defensive Back nomination from the Pac-12 following his 2021 season performance.

College statistics

Professional career

Jones was drafted by the New England Patriots with the 121st pick in the fourth round of the 2022 NFL Draft. On June 9, 2022, Jones officially signed his rookie deal with the Patriots. The deal involved a $746,984 signing bonus and four years totaling $3.6 million in salary.

Jones made his first career start in the Patriots' Week 4 game against the Green Bay Packers. In the first half of the game, Jones had a forced fumble and fumble recovery as well as a pick-six off Aaron Rodgers in the 27-24 overtime loss. Jones became just the fourth player in NFL history to return an interception thrown by Rodgers for a touchdown, joining Tanard Jackson, William Jackson III, and Jamel Dean.

In Week 5 against the Detroit Lions, Jones recorded his second interception of the season off a throw by Jared Goff. Through the first five weeks, Jones was rated the number one cornerback in single-coverage by Pro Football Focus with a rating of 92. He played in 13 games with two starts, recording 30 tackles, two interceptions, and six passes defensed.

Personal life
On June 8, 2018, Jones was arrested at a Panda Express in Santa Paula, California, for commercial burglary. He pled guilty to commercial burglary, a second-degree misdemeanor, and served 45 days of house arrest.

References

External links
 New England Patriots bio
 USC Trojans bio
 Arizona State Sun Devils bio

1997 births
Living people
Players of American football from Long Beach, California
American football cornerbacks
USC Trojans football players
Arizona State Sun Devils football players
New England Patriots players
Long Beach Polytechnic High School alumni